Unholy is the second album by German metal band Brainstorm, released in 1998.
On 23 March 2007 this album and Hungry were remastered by Achim Köhler and re-released by Century Media with four bonus tracks. Metal Blade Records reissued the album as a double CD with both the remastered and original version and all the bonus tracks.

Track listing 
All songs written by Brainstorm (except "Wooly Bully": music & lyrics by Domingo Samudio)

 "MCMXCVIII"  - 2:28
 "Holy War"  - 3:53
 "Here Comes the Pain"  - 3:50
 "Voices"  - 6:29
 "The Healer"  - 4:13
 "Don't Stop Believing"  - 6:50
 "Heart of Hate"  - 5:30
 "Rebellion"  - 5:46
 "For the Love of Money"  - 5:29
 "Love Is a Lie"  - 6:44
 "Into the Fire"  - 4:11
 "Dog Days Coming Down"  - 5:22

1998 edition bonus tracks
 "Wooly Bully"
 "Up from the Ashes" (Japanese release)

2007 remastered edition bonus tracks
"Heart of Hate" (demo)
"Valley of the Kings" (demo)
"The Other Side" (demo)
"Suck My Energy" (demo)

Personnel

Band members
 Marcus Jürgens - lead vocals
 Torsten Ihlenfeld - guitars
 Milan Loncaric - guitars
 Andreas Mailänder - bass
 Dieter Bernert - drums

Additional musicians
 Michael Rodenberg - keyboards
 Uwe Hörmann - guitars
 Harald Sprengler - backing vocals

Production
Charlie Bauerfeind - producer, mixing, mastering
Dirk Schlächter, Uwe Hörmann, Harald Spengler - engineers
Achim Köhler - re-mastering

References

1998 albums
Brainstorm (German band) albums